Waukesha County is a county in the U.S. state of Wisconsin. As of the 2020 United States Census, the population was 406,978, making it the third-most populous county in Wisconsin. Its county seat and largest city is Waukesha. 

Waukesha County is included in the Milwaukee–Waukesha–West Allis, WI Metropolitan Statistical Area.

History
Known as forested and prairie land, the region was first home to Indigenous tribes like Menomonie, Ojibwe (Chippewa), Potawatomi, and Ho-Chunk (Winnebago), who practiced agriculture and trade. In 1836, Native American tribes formally lost title to the land when treaties were disregarded and were forcibly removed by the Federal Army. Prior to the 1830s, the area was unoccupied by settlers due to its inland location and the fact that the Fox River was not a water highway. The New England settlers only came to the area to set up fur trading posts between their new encampments and established cities like Milwaukee. Morris D. Cutler and Alonso Cutler, seeking claims for homesteads, were the first permanent white colonial settlers.

The part of Wisconsin that Waukesha County occupies was a part of Michigan Territory when Milwaukee County was organized in September 1834. On July 4, 1836, the Wisconsin Territory was formed, which included land that is now in the state of Minnesota. In January 1846, part of Milwaukee County was split off into Waukesha County. Curtis Reed was the first county chairman. When a vote decided the county seat, Waukesha defeated Pewaukee by two votes. The name is derived from the Potawatomi word for 'fox' because the streams in the lower part of the county drain into the Fox River.

Waukesha was a New England settlement, and Waukesha's founders were settlers from New England, particularly Connecticut, rural Massachusetts, Vermont, New Hampshire and Maine, as well as from upstate New York who were born to parents who had migrated there from New England shortly after the American Revolution. These people were "Yankees" descended from the English Puritans who settled New England in the 1600s. They were part of a wave of New England farmers who headed west into what was the wilds of the Northwest Territory during the early 1800s. Most arrived as a result of the completion of the Erie Canal as well as the end of the Black Hawk War.

The New Englanders built farms, roads, government buildings and established post routes. They brought many of their Yankee New England values, such as a passion for education that led to the establishment of many schools as well as staunch support for abolitionism. They were mostly members of the Congregationalist Church, though some were Episcopalian. Due to the second Great Awakening some converted to Methodism, and others became Baptists before moving to what is now Waukesha County. Waukesha, like much of Wisconsin, would be culturally very continuous with early New England culture for most of its early history, before the state received a substantial influx of German immigrants in the latter half of the 19th century.

2011 Supreme Court Election
In 2011, the initial unofficial statewide tally in a Wisconsin Supreme Court election had Democratic challenger JoAnne Kloppenburg defeating incumbent justice David Prosser by a 204-vote margin. On the Thursday after the election, Waukesha County Clerk Kathy Nickolaus reported, among other smaller errors, a failure to report votes in the Waukesha city of Brookfield. The newly reported votes gave Prosser the lead, and he retained his seat.

Geography
The Fox River runs through it.

Waukesha County is located to the west of Milwaukee and its suburban development was spurred by the construction of Interstate 94 in Wisconsin.

Lake country
Because of its large number of lakes, the northwestern corner of Waukesha County is referred to as "Lake Country" by local residents. It includes Pewaukee, Delafield, Hartland, Merton, Nashotah, Chenequa, Okauchee Lake, Oconomowoc, Summit, and Lac La Belle.

Adjacent counties
 Washington County – north
 Ozaukee County – northeast
 Milwaukee County – east
 Racine County – southeast
 Walworth County – southwest
 Jefferson County – west
 Dodge County – northwest

Demographics

2020 census
As of the census of 2020, the population was 406,978. The racial makeup of the county was 87.0% White, 3.9% Asian, 1.7% Black or African American, 0.3% Native American, 1.5% from other races, and 5.7% from two or more races. Ethnically, the population was 5.4% Hispanic or Latino of any race.

2010 census
At the 2010 census there were 389,891 people, 152,663 households, and 108,810 families living in the county. The population density was 672 people per square mile (260/km²). There were 160,864  housing units at an average density of 277 per square mile (107/km²). The racial makeup of the county was 93.3% White, 1.3% Black or African American, 0.3% Native American, 2.7% Asian, 0.0003% Pacific Islander, 1.0% from other races, and 1.3% from two or more races. 4.1% of the population were Hispanic or Latino of any race.
Of the 152,663 households 30.8% had children under the age of 18 living with them, 60.7% were married couples living together, 7.1% had a female householder with no husband present, and 28.7% were non-families. 23.8% of households were one person and 10.1% were one person aged 65 or older.  The average household size was 2.52 and the average family size was 3.00.

The age distribution was 24.1% under the age of 18, 6.8% from 18 to 24, 23.6% from 25 to 44, 31.2% from 45 to 64, and 14.3% 65 or older. The median age was 42 years. For every 100 females there were 96.30 males. For every 100 females age 18 and over, there were 93.90 males.

2000 census
At the 2000 census there were 360,767 people, 135,229 households, and 100,475 families living in the county. The population density was 649 people per square mile (251/km²). There were 140,309 housing units at an average density of 252 per square mile (98/km²).  The racial makeup of the county was 95.77% White, 0.73% Black or African American, 0.22% Native American, 1.49% Asian, 0.02% Pacific Islander, 0.87% from other races, and 0.90% from two or more races. 2.63% of the population were Hispanic or Latino of any race. 44.5% were of German, 9.2% Polish, 7.5% Italian, and 7.7% Irish ancestry according to Census 2000. 94.3% spoke English, 2.2% Spanish and 1.2% German as their first language.
Of the 135,229 households 35.40% had children under the age of 18 living with them, 64.80% were married couples living together, 6.80% had a female householder with no husband present, and 25.70% were non-families. 20.90% of households were one person and 8.10% were one person aged 65 or older.  The average household size was 2.63 and the average family size was 3.08.

The age distribution was 26.30% under the age of 18, 6.80% from 18 to 24, 29.80% from 25 to 44, 25.10% from 45 to 64, and 12.00% 65 or older. The median age was 38 years. For every 100 females there were 96.80 males. For every 100 females age 18 and over, there were 94.40 males.

The median household income was $62,839 and the median family income  was $71,773 (these figures had risen to $71,907 and $85,116 respectively as of a 2007 estimate). Males had a median income of $49,232 versus $31,643 for females. The per capita income for the county was $29,164. About 1.7% of families and 2.7% of the population were below the poverty line, including 2.5% of those under age 18 and 4.0% of those age 65 or over.

Government

Elected officials
 County Executive: Paul Farrow
 County Board Chair: Paul Decker
 County Clerk: Meg Wartman (interim)
 Treasurer: Pamela F. Reeves (R)
 Register of Deeds: James Behrend (R)
 Clerk of Circuit Court: Kathy Madden (R)
 District Attorney: Susan Opper (interim)
 Sheriff: Eric Severson (R)

Departments
There are 12 departments in Waukesha County, with most located in the Administration Center.
 Administration
The Department of Administration has five divisions that provide administrative services to the county: the finance division, the human resources division, the information technology division, the purchasing and risk management division, and the administrative services division.
 Aging and Disability Resource Center
The Aging and Disability Resource Center of Waukesha County (ADRC) provides information, assistance, counseling and supportive services regarding adults age 60 and above, adults with physical or developmental disabilities; and adults with mental health or substance abuse concerns. It also provides publicly funded long-term care to county residents.
 Airport
The Waukesha County Airport serves commercial and private aircraft and is supervised by the Airport Commission.
 Corporation Counsel
 Emergency Preparedness
 Bridges Library System
The Bridges Library System works in partnership with 16 public libraries in Waukesha County to cooperatively provide library services. This includes the purchase of shared electronic databases, summer library programming, and circulation services. Bridges also oversees Internet access for member libraries.
 Health and Human Services
 Medical Examiner
The Medical Examiner investigates suspicious or unexplained deaths or deaths that result from a homicide, suicide, or accident. The office also generates statistics for the county.
 Parks and Land Use
The Department of Parks and Land Use (PLU), oversees six divisions that design and maintain county parks. The division also works with state and federal agencies. The planning division administers permits for construction and landscaping activities. The land conservation division works to educate on and regulate soil and water issues. Most programs look to control water runoff and soil erosion. The recycling and solid waste division oversees recycling and disposal programs. It also performs educational outreach on topics such as composting and waste reduction. The official mascot of the recycling division is Recycle Raccoon. The environmental health division oversees animal welfare issues, food safety, and air, water and sewage, and safety issues (such as radon testing, well testing, and septic system monitoring). The land information systems division coordinates databases of information relating to land use and development.
 Public Works
 Sheriff
 University of Wisconsin Extension
The University of Wisconsin-Extension is a partnership with Waukesha County and brings the research of the UW System to families, businesses, governments, and organizations through educational outreach programs. The UW-Extension office also houses 180° Juvenile Diversion, a non-profit organization that rehabilitates first-time young offenders in Waukesha County.
 Veterans

Politics
Waukesha County is the largest Republican-leaning county in Wisconsin and has been one of the GOP's most solid suburban strongholds for many years. It is one of the WOW counties, which share similar traits in suburban Wisconsin.

It has not supported a Democrat for president since 1964, and has only supported a Democrat four other times since 1892. While other non-Southern suburban counties have moved towards Democrats since the 1990s, Waukesha and other Milwaukee suburbs have continued to vote solidly Republican. Underlining this, Lyndon Johnson's narrow win in 1964 is the last time that a Democratic presidential candidate has even garnered 40 percent of the county's vote, though Jimmy Carter, Michael Dukakis, and Joe Biden came close. In 2008, John McCain carried the county by a 25.7% margin over Barack Obama, when Obama won Wisconsin by 13.9% over McCain.

The county is split between 10 state assembly districts, all but one which are held by Republicans, and six state senate districts, all held by Republicans.

Communities

Cities

 Brookfield
 Delafield
 Milwaukee (mostly in Milwaukee County and Washington County)
 Muskego
 New Berlin
 Oconomowoc
 Pewaukee
 Waukesha (county seat)

Villages

 Big Bend
 Butler
 Chenequa
 Dousman
 Eagle
 Elm Grove
 Hartland
 Lac La Belle (partly in Jefferson County)
 Lannon
 Menomonee Falls
 Merton
 Mukwonago (partly in Walworth County)
 Nashotah
 North Prairie
 Oconomowoc Lake
 Pewaukee
 Summit
 Sussex
 Vernon
 Wales
 Waukesha

Towns

 Brookfield
 Delafield
 Eagle
 Genesee
 Lisbon
 Merton
 Mukwonago
 Oconomowoc
 Ottawa

Census-designated places
 North Lake
 Okauchee Lake

Unincorporated communities

 Bethesda
 Buena Vista
 Camp Whitcomb
 Colgate (partly in Washington County)
 Eagleville
 Genesee
 Genesee Depot
 Goerke's Corners
 Guthrie
 Jericho
 Lake Five (partly in Washington County)
 Mapleton
 Monches
 Monterey
 Ottawa
 Saylesville
 Stone Bank
 Summit Center
 Summit Corners
 Vernon
 Waterville

Ghost towns/neighborhoods
 Calhoun
 Dodges Corners
 DeNoon
 Duplainville
 Menomonee
 Muskego Settlement
 New Upsala

Note – for zoning purposes, a single acre of Waukesha County was annexed by the city of Milwaukee in 2003 to accommodate the Ambrosia Chocolate Factory.

Climate

Education
School districts include:

K-12:

 Elmbrook School District
 Hamilton School District
 Kettle Moraine School District
 Menomonee Falls School District
 Mukwonago School District
 Muskego-Norway School District
 New Berlin School District
 Norris School District
 Oconomowoc Area School District
 Palmyra-Eagle Area School District
 Pewaukee School District
 Waukesha School District
 West Allis School District

Secondary:
 Arrowhead Union High School District
 Waterford Union High School District

Elementary:

 Hartland-Lakeside Joint No. 3 School District
 Lake Country School District
 Merton Community School District
 North Lake School District
 Richmond School District
 Stone Bank School District
 Swallow School District
 Washington-Caldwell School District

Transportation

Railroads
Canadian National
Canadian Pacific
Union Pacific
Wisconsin and Southern Railroad

Buses
Waukesha Metro Transit
List of intercity bus stops in Wisconsin

See also
 National Register of Historic Places listings in Waukesha County, Wisconsin
 Waukesha County gangsters
 Waukesha County Park System
 Waukesha, Wisconsin
 Waukesha (village), Wisconsin

References

Further reading
 Haight, Theron W. (ed.) Memoirs of Waukesha County. Madison: Western Historical Association, 1907.
 The History of Waukesha County, Wisconsin. Chicago:  Western Historical Company, 1880.
 Portrait and Biographical Record of Waukesha County, Wisconsin. Chicago: Excelsior Publishing Co. 1894.

External links

 Official website
 

Wisconsin counties
 
1846 establishments in Wisconsin Territory
Populated places established in 1846